Mean Ameen is an album by American jazz saxophonist Ernest Dawkins' New Horizons Ensemble, which was recorded in 2004 and released on Delmark. It was a tribute to New Horizons' trumpeter Ameen Muhammad, who died in 2003 at the age of 48.

Reception

In his review for AllMusic, Scott Yanow states "These musicians are clearly talented in several styles, play with open minds, and react quickly to each other's ideas."

The Penguin Guide to Jazz says "All in all, a fine album, well crafted and full of excellent solo playing. If it's not quite up to previous offerings, the cover portrait of the missing Muhammad goes some way to explaining why."

The All About Jazz review by Rex Butters says "Delmark's sound—clean, live, and rough—delivers the broad tonal options employed by the ensemble. With Mean Ameen, Dawkins and company have created a 21st century hard-bop maelstrom."

In his review for JazzTimes Chris Kelsey notes "The performances are fairly straight-ahead but enormously creative within slightly loosened conventions of small group jazz."

Track listing
All compositions by Ernest Dawkins except as indicated
 "Mean Ameen" – 10:46
 "3-D" (Steve Berry) – 15:12
 "Jeff to the Left" (Steve Berry) – 6:16
 "The Messenger" – 13:33
 "Haiti" – 4:24 
 "Buster and the Search for the Human Genome" – 16:20

Personnel
Ernest Dawkins - alto sax, tenor sax
Maurice Brown – trumpet
Steve Berry – trombone
Darius Savage – bass
Isaiah Spencer – drums

References

2004 albums
Ernest Dawkins albums
Delmark Records albums